The Centre for Studies on Inclusive Education (CSIE) is an independent centre and registered charity based in the United Kingdom which aims to promote inclusion in education.  As part of their work, they publish booklets on inclusive practice, and summaries of laws related to inclusion.

See also

 Special education in the United Kingdom
 Dyslexia support in the United Kingdom

External links
CSIE official website
CSIE resources

Education in the United Kingdom
Special education
Dyslexia